Dennes Dale Boon (April 1, 1958 – December 22, 1985) was an American musician, best known as the guitarist, singer and songwriter of the punk rock trio Minutemen. He was born on April 1, 1958 in San Pedro, California, and formed the Minutemen in 1980 with bassist Mike Watt and drummer George Hurley. The Minutemen were known for their politically charged lyrics and energetic, fast-paced music, and they released several influential albums during their career. Boon died in an automobile accident on December 22, 1985, at the age of 27. Despite his early death, Boon's contributions to punk rock and independent music have been widely recognized. He is remembered as an important figure in the history of these genres.

Biography

Youth
Dennes Boon was born in San Pedro, California, on April 1, 1958. His father, a navy veteran, worked installing radios in Buick cars, and the Boons lived in former World War II barracks that had been converted into public housing.

According to childhood friend and future bandmate Mike Watt, Boon was unfamiliar with popular music and had grown up listening to Buck Owens and Creedence Clearwater Revival. Watt introduced Boon to Blue Öyster Cult and The Who. Urged by Boon's mother, Boon and Watt began to learn to play instruments.

They learned to play by copying songs from their favorite bands' records. Boon took a few lessons from local teacher Roy Mendez Lopez who taught him rock as well as flamenco and classical.

As a teenager, Boon began painting and signed his works "D. Boon," partly because "D" was his slang for cannabis, partly after Daniel Boone, but mostly because it was similar to E. Bloom, Blue Öyster Cult's vocalist and guitarist.

The Reactionaries

Boon formed his first band, The Reactionaries, with Watt in 1978. The band's members were lead vocalist Martin Tamburovich, Boon on guitar, bassist Watt, and drummer George Hurley. The Reactionaries existed for most of 1978 and 1979, practicing regularly but rarely if ever performing live.

After only seven months, Boon and Watt broke the band up feeling that the traditional frontman-style band was "bourgeois."

Minutemen

Boon formed Minutemen in January 1980 with Mike Watt on bass and Frank Tonche on drums. Tonche was soon replaced by former Reactionaries drummer George Hurley. Their best-known album is Double Nickels on the Dime.

Death
The Minutemen continued until December 22, 1985, when Boon was killed in a van accident in the Arizona desert on Interstate 10. Because he had been sick with fever, Boon was lying down in the rear of the van without a seatbelt when the rear axle broke and the van ran off the road. Boon was thrown out the back door of the van and died instantly from a broken neck. He was 27 years old. Boon's death caused the band to immediately dissolve, though Watt and Hurley would form the band Firehose soon after. The live album Ballot Result was released in 1987, two years after Boon's death.

Musical style
Boon's guitar style is very distinctive; he rarely used distortion and frequently set the equalization on his amplifier so that only the treble frequencies were heard – the bass and midrange frequencies would be turned off completely. His style had a heavy funk/blues feel which was very different from other hardcore punk bands in the 1980s.

Artwork
Boon is responsible for the writing and composition of the Minutemen's most anthemic songs (in contrast to Watt's stream of consciousness lyrics), including "This Ain't No Picnic," "Corona," "The Price of Paradise," and "Courage." A lifelong artist, Boon also created drawings or paintings for the Minutemen releases Joy, The Punch Line, The Politics of Time, Project: Mersh and 3-Way Tie (For Last).

Legacy
Since the first Firehose album, Mike Watt has dedicated every record he has worked on – be it Firehose, solo, or otherwise – to D. Boon's memory. A song on Watt's semi-autobiographical 1997 album Contemplating the Engine Room, "The Boilerman," is about D. Boon; on the recording itself, guitarist Nels Cline plays one of Boon's last Telecaster guitars, which Watt is in possession of. Watt also mentions his fallen friend in Firehose's "Disciples of the 3-Way" (Mr. Machinery Operator) and his own "Burstedman" (The Secondman's Middle Stand).

Boon has been paid tribute by American alternative band Stigmata-A-Go-Go with the song "D. Boon," from its 1994 album It's All True, Uncle Tupelo with a different song "D. Boon" from its 1991 album Still Feel Gone, and Centro-matic's song "D.Boon-Free (A Ninth Grade Crime)" off The Static vs. The Strings Vol. 1. His story is also told in the documentary We Jam Econo.

In 2003, former D. Boon roommate Richard Derrick released the CD D. Boon and Friends, a collection of jam session tapes he recorded with D. Boon, and rare Boon solo performances, as the first release on his Box-O-Plenty Records label. Mike Watt authorized the release and provided technical assistance and liner notes.

He is #89 on Rolling Stones list of the 100 greatest guitarists of all time: David Fricke's Picks.

In his review of the band's last album, music critic Robert Christgau described the death of Boon as "a rock death that for wasted potential has Lennon and Hendrix for company," adding that "after seven fairly amazing years he was just getting started. Shit, shit, shit."

Discography

D. Boon and Friends

References

External links
 
 

Minutemen (band) members
American punk rock singers
American punk rock guitarists
Songwriters from California
1958 births
1985 deaths
Lead guitarists
Road incident deaths in Arizona
The Reactionaries members
20th-century American singers
20th-century American guitarists
People from San Pedro, Los Angeles
Guitarists from California
American male guitarists
20th-century American male musicians
American male songwriters